Fordington  may refer to:

Fordington, Dorset, a suburb of Dorchester, England
Fordington (liberty), a former liberty in Dorset, England
 Fordington, Lincolnshire, England